Sonia Ferrer González  (born 26 September 1977) is an actress, model and television presenter on Spanish television.

Biography

Sonia Ferrer was born in Barcelona, Catalonia, Spain. She is the only child of parents Victoria González and Josep Ferrer. Ferrer is a presenter, model and actress. Ferrer was enrolled for six years in the Rosella Hightower Ballet School in Paris. Afterwards, she made Tourism Company Technician, and Locution, Writing and Presentation in Radio and Television studies.

She first worked on television when she played a role in a 13-part mini series for TVE Catalunya called Happy House. She then worked as a presenter on the program Cosmopolitan Café for Via Digital on its Cosmopolitan Channel. Between 2000 and 2008, she co-presented Gente on TVE 1, with Pepa Bueno and then with María Jose Molina.

In 2002, she played a role 'Cleonice' in the film Lisístrata. In 2003, she joined the cast of TVE telenovela Luna negra.

In May 2006, TVE chose Ferrer to announce the Spanish votes for the Eurovision Song Contest. In April 2007, Ferrer hosted the local version of Soundmixshow, Lluvia de estrellas, on TVE 1. In 2011, she co-hosted the political talk show Con voz y voto on Telemadrid, alongside Melchor Miralles. From July 2013 to September 2013, she co-hosted reality show Campamento de verano on Telecinco, alongside Joaquín Prat. Since February 2015, she has made frequent appearances as a panelist on talk show Amigas y conocidas, on TVE 1.

She announced that she would marry her partner Marco Vricella in the summer of 2007. The couple have a daughter born in 2010.

Television

Programmes 
Gente (2000-2008), on TVE 1.
Lluvia de estrellas (2007), on TVE 1.
Aquí no hay playa (2009), on Telemadrid.
Con voz y voto (2011), on Telemadrid.
¡Mira quién salta! (2013), contestant, on  Telecinco.
Campamento de verano (2013), on Telecinco.
Amigas y conocidas (2015–present), panellist, on TVE 1.

Fiction
Happy House (1999) as Yolanda, on TVE Catalunya.
Luna negra (2003) as Mati, on TVE 1.
¿Se puede? (2004), on TVE 1.

Specials
Cartagena te conquistará (2002), on TVE 1.
Murcia, qué hermosa eres (2004), on TVE 1.
Contigo (2004), on TVE 1.
Gala de la Rioja (2006), on TVE 1.
Quién me iba a decir (David Bisbal special) (2006), on TVE 1.
Eurovision Song Contest 2006 (2006), Spanish spokesperson.

See also
 Catalan people
 Inés Sastre
 Natalia Estrada
 Ana Alvarez
 Almudena Fernández

References

Resources
Sonia Ferrer Video Archive
Website Dedicated To Sonia Ferrer

Biography in Spanish
Photos

1977 births
Actresses from Barcelona
Living people
Spanish television presenters
Spanish female models
Spanish women television presenters